Viktorija Zaičikova (born 4 August 2000) is a Latvian footballer who plays as a forward and has appeared for the Latvia women's national team.

Career
Zaičikova has been capped for the Latvia national team, appearing for the team during the 2019 FIFA Women's World Cup qualifying cycle and UEFA Women's Euro 2022 qualifying.

References

External links
 
 
 

2000 births
Living people
Latvian women's footballers
Women's association football forwards
Latvia women's youth international footballers
Latvia women's international footballers